Kirill Viktorovich Bogdanets (born 28 March 2004) is a Russian footballer who plays as a forward for FC Krasnodar and FC Krasnodar-2.

Club career
Bogdanets made his debut for FC Krasnodar on 27 November 2022 in a Russian Cup game against FC Khimki.

Career statistics

References

External links
 
 
 
 

Living people
2004 births
Russian footballers
Association football forwards
Russia youth international footballers
Russian First League players
FC Krasnodar-2 players
FC Krasnodar players